Ahir Shah (born 28 December 1990) is a British comedian. He was nominated for the Edinburgh Comedy Award at the Edinburgh Festival Fringe in 2017 and 2018, and was a finalist in the 2008 So You Think You're Funny?  competition for new acts. He has been called "one of his generation's most eloquent comic voices".

Early life
Shah was born and raised in London. His parents, Vikram and Ulka, are originally from India. Shah's mother is a state primary school teacher. His grandmother, who had been living with the family in the UK, was deported to India when Shah was five years old.

He attended Preston Manor comprehensive school in Wembley and went on to the University of Cambridge. He graduated in 2012 with a degree in Politics, Psychology and Sociology (PPS) from Clare College.

Career
When he was 15, Shah started doing comedy at open mic nights. His father had encouraged him to try different extracurricular activities, and stand-up comedy "struck a passion". He performed all through his school and university years, taking his debut show Astrology to Edinburgh in 2011.

In 2019 he toured the UK with his show Dots. His previous shows are Astrology (2011), Anatomy (2013), Texture (2014), Distant (2015), Machines (2016), Control (2017), and Duffer (2018).

Shah is a writer and performer on BBC Two's satirical news show The Mash Report. He has appeared on TV panel shows including Frankie Boyle's New World Order, Have I Got News For You and Mock the Week, on BBC Radio 4's The News Quiz, and has performed on Live at The Apollo. His acting credits include roles in Campus, Brotherhood, and Catastrophe.

In December 2019, it was announced that Shah would be joining fellow comedian Suzi Ruffell on her new radio panel show entitled Explicable Me on BBC Radio 2. In 2021, Shah had an HBO special called Dots.

Personal life
Shah has suffered from depression, and has discussed coming off medication for it during his stand up routine. He has spoken about his reluctance to be a "nodding dog" (an unthinking advocate) for white guilt in relation to European colonialism.

During the November 2015 Paris attacks, Shah was performing at Le Paname Art Café in the Rue de la Fontaine-au-Roi, only a few doors down from the Café Bonne Biere that was one of the attack sites. The experience formed part of Shah's 2016 show Machines.

References

External links
 Official website
 Twitter
 Agent's website
 
 

English male comedians
English people of Indian descent
Living people
British atheists
1990 births
Comedians from Wembley